Garwood is an unincorporated community in northern Kootenai County, Idaho, United States.

Garwood Elementary School is located nearby. Constructed in 1991, it is also used as a local polling place.

History
Garwood's population was 18 in 1925.

US Highway 95 and a line of the Union Pacific Railroad were built through Garwood. A rail line was also constructed between Garwood and Burnt Cabin Creek in 1924.

References

Unincorporated communities in Idaho
Unincorporated communities in Kootenai County, Idaho